The Copa RN is a trophy organized by the Federação Norte-rio-grandense de Futebol (FNF) who currently represents the winners of the second round of the Campeonato Potiguar.

Champions 
List of the champions of the Copa RN of 2008 to 2022:

Titles by Team

See also

Campeonato Potiguar
Copa Cidade do Natal
Copa Rio Grande do Norte

References

External links 
 Official Site of the FNF

Campeonato Potiguar